Stenomesosa is a genus of longhorn beetles of the subfamily Lamiinae, containing the following species:

 Stenomesosa flavomaculata Breuning, 1939
 Stenomesosa rondoni Breuning, 1968

References

Mesosini